Xhensila Myrtezaj (born 9 April 1993) is an Albanian singer and entrepreneur.

Life and career 

Myrtezaj was born on 9 April 1993 in Tirana, Albania, to Albanian parents, who divorced when she was a child. At an early age, she attended the Jordan Misja Lyceum in Tirana. She became known for the talent show "Ethet e së premtes mbrëma", in which she took part at the age of 14. She also took part in the casting show Top Fest with the song A më do. In 2009 she appeared on Top Fest 6 with the song Ekzistoj, but did not reach the final.

In 2010 Myrtezaj sang A Me Do? At Top Fest 7. In 2011 she took part in Top Fest 8 with the song Engjëlli and won the Best Song Award in the Pop / R & B area. In December 2011, Myrtezaj took part in the Albanian preliminary selection for the Eurovision Song Contest 2012, Festivali i Këngës with the song "Lulet mbledh për hënën". She reached the final of the competition where she finished 13th overall.

In November 2016, she released "Uh Baby" with Kosovo-Albanian singer Kida. In June 2018 she sang "Çika Çika" with Ardian Bujupi. This song reached 100 million clicks on YouTube. They also released "Panorama" together in July 2020 which counts more than 60 million views to date.

Personal life 

On 12 July 2018, Myrtezaj gave birth to their daughter Ajka.
On December 2022, it was announced that the singer and her husband Bes Kallaku are facing disagreements on their relationship and are in a subject for a possible divorce.

Discography

Singles

As lead artist

As featured artist

References 

1993 births
21st-century Albanian women singers
Albanian pop singers
Albanian Roman Catholics
Albanian fashion businesspeople
Converts to Roman Catholicism
Festivali i Këngës contestants
Living people
Musicians from Tirana